Faustino Fernández Ovies (born 16 February 1953) is a former Spanish racing cyclist.

A professional for five seasons, Ovies is best known for winning the mountain classification at the 1977 Giro d'Italia, and the 1980 Vuelta Ciclista a Aragón. His best placing on a grand tour was 12th at the 1980 Vuelta a Espana.

Major results

1976
 2nd Overall Vuelta a Segovia
1977
 1st  Mountains classification Giro d'Italia
1978
 1st Subida a Arrate
1979
 1st Stage 3 Vuelta a los Valles Mineros
 2nd Overall Vuelta a Asturias
1st Stage 3
 3rd Overall Vuelta a Cantabria
1980
 1st  Overall Vuelta a Aragón
1st Stage 1

References

1953 births
Living people
Spanish male cyclists
People from Siero
Cyclists from Asturias